The Duke of Buckingham series is a 1590s cycle of Old and New Testament paintings by Paolo Veronese and his workshop. They were acquired in Venice in 1595 by Charles de Croy, then duke of Aarschot, and moved to his castle at Beaumont. It was acquired early in the 17th century by George Villiers, 1st Duke of Buckingham, hence its title. Most of the series are in the Kunsthistorisches Museum in Vienna, though two are in the National Gallery in Prague and one in the National Gallery of Art in Washington.

References

Paintings by Paolo Veronese
Paintings depicting figures from the Book of Genesis
Paintings of Esther
Paintings depicting people in the deuterocanonical books
Paintings based on the Gospels
1590s paintings
Collections of the National Gallery of Art
Paintings in the collection of the National Gallery Prague
Paintings in the collection of the Kunsthistorisches Museum